Tasso (or Taso) (died 617) was the joint Duke of Friuli with his younger brother Kakko from their father's death (611) to their own. Their father was Gisulf II and their mother Romilda of Friuli. In or around 611, Gisulf was killed fending off an Avar invasion.

Tasso, along with his brothers Kakko, Radoald, and Grimoald, escaped the Avars and evaded capture, successfully setting themselves up as Gisulf's successors. During their reign, they ruled over the Slavs of the valley of the Gail up to Matrei and imposed a tribute upon them.

Tasso and Kakko were treacherously killed one day by Gregory, exarch of Ravenna. The exarch, having invited Tasso to Oderzo for a ceremonial beard-cutting, had him hunted down and killed along with Kakko. Radoald and Grimoald fled to Arechis I of Benevento and Friuli passed to their uncle Grasulf II.

Notes

Sources
Paul the Deacon. Historia Langobardorum. Available at Northvegr.

Year of birth missing
617 deaths
Dukes of Friuli
Lombard warriors
7th-century Lombard people
7th-century rulers in Europe